In ancient Greek religion and mythology, Plutus is the god and the personification of wealth, and the son of the goddess of agriculture Demeter and the mortal Iasion.

Family
Plutus is most commonly the son of Demeter and Iasion, with whom she lay in a thrice-ploughed field. He is alternatively the son of the fortune goddess Tyche.

Two ancient depictions of Plutus, one of him as a little boy standing with a cornucopia before Demeter, and another inside the cornucopia being handed to Demeter by a goddess rising out of the earth, perhaps implying that he had been born in the Underworld, were interpreted by Karl Kerenyi to mean that Plutus was supposed to be the son of Hades and Persephone, the king and the queen of the Underworld, though no such version is attested in any primary source.

In the arts

In the philosophized mythology of the later Classical period, Plutus is envisaged by Aristophanes as blinded by Zeus, so that he would be able to dispense his gifts without prejudice; he is also lame, as he takes his time arriving, and winged, so he leaves faster than he came. When the god's sight is restored, in Aristophanes' comedy, he is then able to determine who is deserving of wealth, creating havoc.

Phaedrus records a fable where, after Hercules is received in Olympus, he greets all the gods but refuses to greet Plutus. When the king of gods Jupiter asks him why, he replies that he hates the god of riches due to Plutus favouring the wicked and the corrupt.

Among the Eleusinian figures painted on Greek ceramics, regardless of whether he is depicted as child or youthful ephebe, Plutus can be identified as the one bearing the cornucopia—horn of plenty. In later allegorical bas-reliefs, Plutus is depicted as a boy in the arms of Eirene, as Prosperity is the gift of "Peace", or in the arms of Tyche, the Fortune of Cities.

In Lucian of Samosata's satirical dialogue Timon, Ploutus, the very embodiment of worldly goods written up in a parchment will, says to Hermes:

In Canto VII of Dante's Inferno, Plutus is a demon of wealth who guards the fourth circle of Hell, "The Hoarders and the Wasters". Dante likely included Plutus to symbolize the evil of hoarding wealth. He is known for saying the famous phrase, "Pape Satàn, pape Satàn aleppe."

In addition, 
Erasmus writes in The Praise of Folly that Folly is the offspring of Plutus.

Etymology
Like many other figures in Greek and Roman mythology, Plutus' name is related to several English words. These include:
 Plutocracy, rule by the wealthy, and plutocrat, one who rules by virtue of wealth
 Plutonomics, the study of wealth management
 Plutolatry, the "worship" of money
 Plutomania, an excessive desire for wealth

See also

 Chrysus
 Kubera
 Mammon
 Pluto (mythology)
 Ploutonion

Notes

References
 Aristophanes, Plutus (Wealth), in Aristophanes, Frogs, Assemblywomen, Wealth, edited and translated by Jeffrey Henderson, Loeb Classical Library No. 180, Cambridge, Massachusetts, Harvard University Press, 2002. Online version at Harvard University Press. .
 Diodorus Siculus, Library of History, Volume III: Books 4.59-8, translated by C. H. Oldfather, Loeb Classical Library No. 340. Cambridge, Massachusetts, Harvard University Press, 1939. . Online version at Harvard University Press. Online version by Bill Thayer.
 Grimal, Pierre, The Dictionary of Classical Mythology, Wiley-Blackwell, 1996. .
 Hesiod, Theogony, in The Homeric Hymns and Homerica with an English Translation by Hugh G. Evelyn-White, Cambridge, Massachusetts, Harvard University Press; London, William Heinemann Ltd. 1914. Online version at the Perseus Digital Library.
 Hyginus, Gaius Julius, De Astronomica, in The Myths of Hyginus, edited and translated by Mary A. Grant, Lawrence: University of Kansas Press, 1960. Online version at ToposText.
 Kerényi, Karl (1967), Eleusis: Archetypal Image of Mother and Daughter, Princeton University Press, 1991. .
 Morford, Mark P. O., Robert J. Lenardon, Classical Mythology, Eighth Edition, Oxford University Press, 2007. .
 The Oxford Classical Dictionary, second edition,  Hammond, N.G.L. and Howard Hayes Scullard (editors), Oxford University Press, 1992. .

Abundance gods
Fortune gods
Greek gods
Children of Demeter
Personifications in Greek mythology
Deeds of Zeus